Luka may refer to:

People
 Luka (given name), a South Slavic masculine given name cognate of Luke, and a Japanese given name
 Luka (singer), stage name of Brazilian singer and songwriter Luciana Karina Santos de Lima (born 1979)
 Luka Keʻelikōlani (1826–1883), Hawaiian princess and governor

Places

Bosnia and Herzegovina 
 Luka, Ilijaš, a village 
 Luka, Srebrenica, a village 
 Luka, Bosansko Grahovo, a village
 Luka, Konjic, a village 
 Luka, Gacko, a village 
 Luka, Srebrenik, a village 
 Luka, Nevesinje, a village

Croatia 
 Luka, Dubrovnik-Neretva County, a village near Ston
 , a village on the island of Dugi Otok
 Luka, Zagreb County, a village and a municipality near Zaprešić
 Luka, Vrbovec, a village near Vrbovec

Czech Republic 
 Luka (Prague Metro), a metro station in Prague
 Luka (Česká Lípa District), a municipality and village
 , a village and part of Verušičky
 Luká, a municipality and village in Olomouc District
 Luka nad Jihlavou, a market town in Jihlava District

Democratic Republic of the Congo 
 , a river that flows through the Kahuzi-Biéga National Park

Poland 
 Łuka, Podlaskie Voivodeship, a village
 Łuka, Warmian-Masurian Voivodeship, a village

Serbia 
 Luka (Bor), a village

Slovakia 
 Lúka, a village in the Trenčín Region

Other uses 
 "Luka" (song), by Suzanne Vega
 Luka (film), a 1992 film by Tomislav Radić
 MW Motors Luka EV, a Czech electric car
 Megurine Luka, sound library for the vocal synthesizer Vocaloid

See also 
 
 Luca (disambiguation)

pl:Łuka